Nova Štifta is a settlement in the Upper Dreta Valley in the Municipality of Gornji Grad in Slovenia. It is made up of three hamlets: Šmiklavž, Tirosek, and Zgornji Dol (formerly known as Štajngrob). The area belongs to the traditional region of Styria and is now included in the Savinja Statistical Region.

Churches

The parish church in the settlement is a popular pilgrimage church. It is known as Our Lady, Star of the Sea Church and belongs to the Roman Catholic Diocese of Celje. It has a large nave with three chapels on either side and two belfries on its western facade. It was built until 1854 by the master builder Matej Medved on the site of a former three-nave Renaissance church, which burnt in fire in 1850. A second church in the hamlet of Šmiklavž is dedicated to Saint Nicholas. It is octagonal in its floor plan with an added belfry and two rectangular chapels. It was built between 1869 and 1872. The third church stands in Zgornji Dol and is dedicated to the Presentation of Mary. It was erected in the early 16th century and redesigned in the 19th century.

Gallery

References

External links

Nova Štifta on Geopedia

Populated places in the Municipality of Gornji Grad